This table displays the top-rated primetime television series of the 1998–99 season as measured by Nielsen Media Research.

References

1998 in American television
1999 in American television
1998-related lists
1999-related lists
Lists of American television series